The 2015 Big East men's lacrosse tournament took place April 30 to May 2 at Villanova Stadium in  Villanova, Pennsylvania. The winner of the tournament received the Big East Conference's automatic bid to the 2015 NCAA Division I Men's Lacrosse Championship. Four teams from the Big East conference will compete in the single elimination event. The seeds were based upon the teams' regular season conference record.

Standings

Only the top four teams in the Big Ten conference advanced to the Big East Conference Tournament.

Schedule

Bracket
Villanova Field – Villanova, Pennsylvania

 denotes an overtime game

All-Tournament
Johnny Gallaway, Villanova, Jr., A

Danny Seibel, Villanova, Fr., A

Dan Mojica, Marquette, RS-Jr., D

Conor Gately, Marquette, Jr., A

Craig Berge, Georgetown, Fr., M

Bo Stafford, Georgetown, Sr., A

Nick Marrocco, Georgetown, Sr., GK

Erik Adamson, Denver, Sr., M

Trevor Baptiste, Denver, Fr., M/FOS

Wesley Berg, Denver, Sr., A

Connor Cannizzaro, Denver, So., A

Most Outstanding Player
Connor Cannizzaro, Denver, So., A

Most Outstanding Goalie
Nick Marrocco, Georgetown, Sr., GK

References

Big East Tournament
Big East Men's Lacrosse
Big East Conference men's lacrosse